Kolluk Daraq (also Romanized as Kollūk Daraq, Kolūk Daraq, and Kollook Daraq; also known as Kollūg Dareh, Kolūkh Dareh, Kūlūk Dareh, Kuluk Darreh, and Kulyukdara) is a village in Meydan Chay Rural District, in the Central District of Tabriz County, East Azerbaijan Province, Iran. At the 2006 census, its population was 104, in 22 families.

References 

Populated places in Tabriz County